Jean-Marc Tailhardat (born 12 April 1966) is a retired French pole vaulter.

He finished fifteenth at the 1989 European Indoor Championships. He won silver medals at the 1989 and 1994 Jeux de la Francophonie, and also became French indoor champion in 1989.

His personal best jump was 5.70 metres, achieved in June 1991 in Montgeron.

References

1966 births
Living people
French male pole vaulters
Mediterranean Games silver medalists for France
Mediterranean Games medalists in athletics
Athletes (track and field) at the 1991 Mediterranean Games
20th-century French people
21st-century French people